The president of Dominica is the head of state under the system implemented by the Constitution of 1978, the year of Dominica's independence.

The current president is Charles Savarin, since 2 October 2013.

Presidents of Dominica (1978–present)

Status

See also 

List of colonial governors and administrators of Dominica 
List of heads of government of Dominica
Lists of office-holders

Notes

References

External links
Official site of the President's Office, Commonwealth of Dominica
World Statesmen - Dominica

 
Government of Dominica
Dominica
Presidents
1978 establishments in Dominica